Qaleh-ye Gav Godar (also Romanized as Qal‘eh-ye Gāv Godār; also known as Gāv Godār) is a village in Pol-e Doab Rural District, Zalian District, Shazand County, Markazi Province, Iran. At the 2006 census, its population was 151, in 42 families.

References 

Populated places in Shazand County